Kari Sakari Kantalainen (born 14 January 1947 in Valkeakoski) is a Finnish business executive and politician. He was a member of the Parliament of Finland from 1995 to 2003, representing the National Coalition Party.

References

1947 births
Living people
People from Valkeakoski
National Coalition Party politicians
Members of the Parliament of Finland (1995–99)
Members of the Parliament of Finland (1999–2003)